Miss Suriname is a national Beauty pageant in Suriname. The pageant is now under Tropical Beauties Suriname Foundation which selected the titleholders to Miss Supranational and Mister Supranational.

History
Miss Suriname was held in 1951 for first time. The pageant was run by Lions International Organization until 1999. Since 1958 the winner of Miss Suriname represents her country at the Miss Universe or sometimes Miss World. On occasion, when the winner does not qualify (due to age) for either contest, a runner-up is sent. In 1999 is the last participation of Suriname at the Miss Universe before the local pageant absent to held the contest. In 2007 after returning in new concept, Miss Suriname run by A.P.R.A (Angel's Public Relations & Administration) and decided to send its winner to Miss World.

2007-2012
After a long period of inactivity regarding The National Pageant, The Miss Suriname Pageant began in 2007 by A.P.R.A. (Angel's Public Relations & Administration). In addition in 2007 Miss Suriname collaborated to Miss Suriname, Little Miss Suriname and Miss Teen Model Suriname. The pageant is being national franchise holder for Miss World and Miss Earth until 2008 and Miss International until 2012.

2011-Present
In 2011 Miss Suriname divided to two contests which are Miss Suriname by A.P.R.A and Miss Tropical Beauties Suriname. Both of pageants have different purposes. Miss Tropical Beauties Suriname comes to promote the culture of Suriname and the winner will become a goodwill ambassador of her country. The pageant is also becoming national franchise for Miss Earth, Miss International, Miss Supranational and Miss Grand International.

International winners
Miss West Indies
1955 — Greta Nahar

Galleries

Titleholders

 Winner International Title 
 Miss Universe Suriname
 Miss World Suriname
 Miss International Suriname
 Miss Earth Suriname
 Miss Supranational Suriname
 Miss Grand International Suriname
 Mister Supranational Suriname

The winners of Miss Suriname represented the country at Miss Universe pageant. In 1959, 1965 and 1981 Alita Visser, Anita van Eyck and Joan Boldewijn withdrew at Miss Universe, due to unknown reasons. Gertrud Gummels is the only Miss Suriname who placed in the Top 15. Ingrid Mamadeus made a debut at the Miss International 1971 competition.

References

External links
misstropicalbeauties.org

Suriname
Suriname
Suriname
Suriname
Recurring events established in 1951
Beauty pageants in Suriname
Surinamese awards